Thomas James Sharpy is a retired United States Air Force lieutenant general who last served as the deputy chief of staff for capability development of the Allied Command Transformation. Previously, he was the deputy commander of the Air Mobility Command.

He retired on November 1, 2021.

Effective dates of promotions

References

Living people
Place of birth missing (living people)
Recipients of the Air Force Distinguished Service Medal
Recipients of the Defense Superior Service Medal
Recipients of the Legion of Merit
United States Air Force generals
United States Air Force personnel of the Gulf War
Year of birth missing (living people)